The 2017 AFC Cup group stage was played from 20 February to 31 May 2017. A total of 34 teams competed in the group stage to decide the 11 places in the knockout stage of the 2017 AFC Cup.

Draw

The seeding of each team in the draw was determined by their association and their qualifying position within their association. The mechanism of the draw was as follows:
For the West Asia Zone, a draw was held for the five associations with two direct entrants (Iraq, Syria, Jordan, Bahrain, Lebanon) to determine the three associations occupying seeds 1 and 2, with seeds 1 placed in order for Groups A, B and C, and the two associations occupying seeds 3 and 4, with seeds 3 placed in order for Groups A and B. The remaining teams were then allocated to groups according to the rules set by AFC.
For the ASEAN Zone, a draw was held for the four associations with two direct entrants (Vietnam, Malaysia, Myanmar, Philippines) to determine the three associations occupying seeds 1 and 2, with seeds 1 placed in order for Groups F, G and H, and the one association occupying seeds 3 and 4, with seed 3 placed in Group F. The remaining teams were then allocated to the groups according to the rules set by AFC.
For the Central Asia Zone, the South Asia Zone, and the East Asia Zone, no draw was held, and the teams were allocated to the groups according to their association ranking published on 30 November 2016.

The following 34 teams entered into the group stage draw, which included the 29 direct entrants and the five winners of the play-off round of the qualifying play-offs, whose identity were not known at the time of the draw. Originally there were 30 direct entrants and six winners of the play-off round, but there were one fewer direct entrant in the ASEAN Zone due to the withdrawal of one team, and the East Asia Zone qualifying play-offs were not played due to the withdrawal of three teams.

Standby teams
 Al-Jazeera (for Al-Wehdat)
 East Bengal (for Bengaluru FC)
 SHB Đà Nẵng (for Hà Nội)
 Kedah (for Johor Darul Ta'zim)
 Yangon United (for Yadanarbon)
 Loyola Meralco Sparks (for Global Cebu)
 Geylang International (for Tampines Rovers)

Format

Tiebreakers

Schedule
The schedule of each matchday was as follows (W: West Asia Zone; C: Central Asia Zone; S: South Asia Zone; A: ASEAN Zone; E: East Asia Zone). Matches in the West Asia Zone were played on Mondays and Tuesdays, while matches in the Central Asia Zone, the South Asia Zone, the ASEAN Zone, and the East Asia Zone were played on Tuesdays and Wednesdays.

Groups

Group A

Group B

Group C

Group D

Group E

Group F

Group G

Group H

Group I

Ranking of second-placed teams

West Asia Zone

ASEAN Zone

Notes

References

External links
, the-AFC.com
AFC Cup 2017, stats.the-AFC.com

2
February 2017 sports events in Asia
March 2017 sports events in Asia
April 2017 sports events in Asia
May 2017 sports events in Asia